Enlight Renewable Energy is a publicly traded company, headquartered in Israel, that builds and operates solar and wind power facilities. Its shares are traded on the Tel Aviv Stock Exchange.

Operations 
Enlight Renewable Energy operates in the renewable energy industry as a developer and operator of solar and wind power facilities. It owns rights to photovoltaic facilities in Israel and Italy.

Italy 
In November 2010 Enlight signed agreements with two Italian companies for the establishment of Italy-based SPVs to lead the development of solar energy farms and rooftop solar energy projects in Italy.

Israel 
In January 2011 Enlight won a state tender to install photovoltaic panels above the roofs of buildings on Israeli military bases.

In August 2011 Enlight entered into agreements with six communities in the Golan Heights to construct wind turbines on their land, subject to regulatory approval and clearance from Israel's Ministry of Defense.

Enlight led the development of the Halutziot project, one of Israel's largest solar energy undertakings, in the western Negev. At a capacity of 55 MW and an area of 0.8 km2, Halutziot was the largest solar power station in Israel upon its completion in 2015.

In June 2018, Enlight received permission to build Israel's largest wind power station, to be completed in 2020–2021. The plant, located in the Valley of Tears, will generate 96–99 MW of electricity.

Sweden
In October 2020, Enlight acquired Swedish wind power project Björnberget, located in central Sweden and expected to contain 60 wind turbines.
The first turbine became operational in 2022 and Enlight expected completion by 2023.

United States
Enlight announced its acquisition of a controlling (90% stake) interest in U.S. solar and storage developer Clēneras, in June 2021. Through a wholly-owned U.S. subsidiary, Enlight paid $433 million to acquire the Boise, Idaho company. Clēnera's founders, Jason Ellsworth and Adam Pishl  retain 10% of Clēnera's shares.

Business model 
Enlight describes itself as a vertical integration company, capable of operating in all four areas of the energy production chain so as to reduce licensing timeframes and generate higher returns on investments. The first of the four areas is the initiation stage, which involves locating suitable land or rooftops and entering into agreements with the owners; the second is the development and planning stage, which involves planning the facility and obtaining regulatory clearance; the third is the financing and installation stage, which involves financing the project and connecting the facility to the electricity grid; the fourth and last is the electricity sale, operation and maintenance stage, which involves selling the electricity produced and managing the facility.

Corporate history 
Enlight Energy was founded by Gilad Yavetz, Zafrir Yoeli and Amit Paz. The company joined the Tel Aviv Stock Exchange in June 2010 through a reverse merger with Sahar Investments Ltd. Sahar, which prior to the merger was a shell company belonging to Shaul Elovitch's Eurocom Group, subsequently changed its name to Enlight Renewable Energy Ltd.

See also 
 Clean technology
 Renewable energy
 Solar power in Israel
 Sustainable energy
 List of companies of Israel

References

External links 
 Eurocom Group

Energy companies of Israel
Renewable energy companies of Asia
Renewable energy in Israel
Solar energy in Israel
Energy companies established in 2008
Renewable resource companies established in 2008
Companies listed on the Tel Aviv Stock Exchange
Israeli companies established in 2008

he:אנלייט אנרגיה מתחדשת